Abu'l-Faḍl al-Abbas ibn Fasanjas, was an Iranian statesman Fasanjas family who served the Buyid dynasty.

He was from a rich Iranian noble family which was native to Shiraz in Fars. When the Buyid ruler Imad al-Dawla conquered Shiraz, Abu'l-Faḍl pledged allegiance to him, and supplied him with money so he could pay his Daylamite troops. Abu'l-Faḍl later served Mu'izz al-Dawla, who was the brother of Imad al-Dawla and ruler of Iraq. Abu'l-Faḍl, during his stay in Iraq, became the financial minister of Basra, and later died in 953 at the age of 77. He had two sons named Abu'l-Faraj Muhammad and Abu Muhammad al-Fasanjas, who also served the Buyids under high office.

Sources 
 
 
 

Fasanjas family
Buyid officials
870s births
953 deaths
Year of birth uncertain
10th-century Iranian politicians
People from Shiraz